The following elections occurred in the year 1861.

Africa

Liberia 

 1861 Liberian general election

North America

Canada
 1861 Newfoundland general election

United States
 1861 California gubernatorial election
 1861 New York state election
 United States Senate election in New York, 1861

South America

Chile 

 1861 Chilean presidential election

Europe

Dalmatia 

1861 Dalmatian parliamentary election

Oceania

New Zealand 

 1860–1861 New Zealand general election

See also
 :Category:1861 elections

1861
Elections